Seattle Girls' School is an all-girls middle school located in the central district of Seattle at South Jackson Street and MLK Way S. between 26th AVE S and 28th AVE S.  Seattle Girls' School (also known as SGS) is an accredited member of the Northwest Association of Independent Schools and a full member of the National Association of Independent Schools.

In the 2011–2012 academic year, SGS enrolled 105 students. The student-teacher ratio is currently about 10:1, and the average class size 15. Tuition was $2,389 a school month in 2011-2012 totaling $21,500 for the school year.

History
Seattle Girls' School was founded by the board of trustees, a group of Seattle residents, in fall 2001. The school's current location at the corner of S. Jackson Street and MLK Way S was not completely finished when students for that year were being admitted, and the first open house was held in a gymnasium.

From the founding in 2001 to 2005 SGS accepted students through 6th and 7th grade. In the 2005-2006 year 5th grade and 8th grade was added.

References

External links
Seattle Girls' School

Schools in Seattle
Girls' schools in Washington (state)
Private middle schools in Washington (state)
Educational institutions established in 2001
2001 establishments in Washington (state)